The Phiale Painter, also known as Boston Phiale Painter, was a painter of the Attic red-figure style. He was active around 460 to 430 BC. The Phiale Painter is assumed to have been a pupil of the Achilles Painter. In contrast to his master, he liked to depict narrative scenes. He painted several large calyx kraters, often with two registers of figures; unlike his master, he seems to have preferred larger vessels in general. This is shown by his white-ground works, which are not well known, but more expressive than those of the Achilles Painter. Apart from a number of lekythoi, he painted two chalice kraters in white-ground technique, a rarity at the time. His themes may be partially influenced by contemporary theatre. His preferred name for kalos inscriptions is that of Euaion, son of Aeschylus. His conventional name is based on the fact that a painted phiale, a vase shape rarely equipped with figural depictions, is known from him.

Bibliography
 John Beazley. Attic Red Figure Vase Painters. Oxford: Clarendon Press, 1963.
 John Boardman. Rotfigurige Vasen aus Athen. Die klassische Zeit, Philipp von Zabern, Mainz, 1991 (Kulturgeschichte der Antiken Welt, Band 48), besonders S. 65 und 137f. .

External links

Works at the Getty Museum
White lekythos at the Beazley Archive
Terracotta lekythos at the Metropolitan Museum of Art
Vase at the V&A Museum
Chalice-shaped krater at the Vatican

5th-century BC deaths
Ancient Greek vase painters
Anonymous artists of antiquity
People from Attica
Year of birth unknown